The New Zealand X class was a pioneering class of eighteen 4-8-2 steam locomotives built for New Zealand Railways Department (NZR) and designed by A. L. Beattie that operated on the national rail network of New Zealand. In 1908, a heavy and powerful locomotive was required to haul traffic on the newly completed mountainous central section of the North Island Main Trunk Railway, and as a logical progression of the 4-6-2 Q class design, the 4-8-2 wheel arrangement was created for the X class.

Overview 

When the first X was completed in 1908 at NZR's Addington Workshops in Christchurch, it was the very first 4-8-2 tender locomotive built in the world. The 4-8-2 design went on to be popular in the United States and was nicknamed the "Mountain" type; one theory suggests this name stems from the mountainous terrain that inspired the X's design, while another suggests the Chesapeake and Ohio Railway first coined the name in reference to its 4-8-2s of 1911 that were built to operate in the Allegheny Mountains.

They were built as de Glehn compound locomotives, but during the 1940s, most of the class were converted to simple, superheated locomotives. This increased their power but did not prolong their lives and most were officially withdrawn from service on 2 March 1957, though a few had been taken out of service earlier and two were sold to the Ohai Railway Board (ORB) in 1946 that operated a private industrial line at the end of the Wairio Branch.

Preservation 
When the ORB introduced diesel locomotives in 1968, X 442 was donated to the New Zealand Railway and Locomotive Society, and it was eventually stored at Ferrymead in Christchurch. In 2002 X 442 was relocated to the Feilding and District Steam Rail Society depot in Feilding. Two X class boilers are held by Mainline Steam.

References

Citations

Bibliography

External links 
 New Zealand Railways Steam Locomotives - Class X
 An X class locomotive ex-Petone Workshops with a new superheated boiler c1928

X class
4-8-2 locomotives
Compound locomotives
3 ft 6 in gauge locomotives of New Zealand
Railway locomotives introduced in 1908
2′D1′ h4v locomotives
2′D1′ h4 locomotives